The Leaning Tower of Teluk Intan is a clock and a leaning tower in Teluk Intan, Hilir Perak District, Perak, Malaysia. It is the Malaysian equivalent of the Leaning Tower of Pisa.

History 
The tower, also known as the Clock Tower, was built to store water during the dry season, in case of fire as well as to keep time.

It was built under contractor Leong Choon Chong in 1885 but was claimed by a Briton, Neol Danison, and then by the Japanese during their occupation of Malaysia in 1941 when they used it as a watch tower.

After independence in 1957, the tower became an official national monument.

Design
The pagoda style structure was greatly influenced by Chinese architecture, because the majority of the population of the town at that time was Chinese. Each storey is 5 metres high and there are a total of 110 steps from the ground floor to the top of the tower.

The water tank, which is 5 metres high and 18.36 cubic metres deep, is on the third floor and is made of steel. The foundation is 13 metres in diameter and tapers to a diameter of 8.2 metres at the top of the tower.

Leaning
The reasons why the tower leans is the soft ground on which it was built, as well as the weight of the water in the water tank, which causes it to lean towards the southwest.

See also

 List of tourist attractions in Perak

References 

Buildings and structures in Perak
Inclined towers in Malaysia
Teluk Intan
Towers completed in 1886
Clock towers in Malaysia
Tourist attractions in Perak